Inachoididae is a family of crabs originally erected by James Dwight Dana in 1852. It was not recognised as a valid family until the early 1980s. Its members closely resemble those of the family Inachidae, and the Inachoididae could be recognised as a subfamily of that family.

Aepinus Rathbun, 1897
Anasimus A. Milne-Edwards, 1880
Arachnopsis Stimpson, 1871
Batrachonotus Stimpson, 1871
Collodes Stimpson, 1860
Euprognatha Stimpson, 1871
Inachoides H. Milne-Edwards & Lucas, 1842
Leurocyclus Rathbun, 1897
Paradasygyius Garth, 1958
Pyromaia Stimpson, 1871

References

Majoidea
Decapod families